Cooking Channel is a Canadian English language discretionary specialty channel and a localized version of the U.S. channel of the same name owned by Corus Entertainment and Warner Bros. Discovery. Dedicated to programming related to food and cooking, its branding is licensed from Discovery Inc. (formerly Scripps Networks Interactive), which holds a minority ownership, and is also a partner on sister channel Food Network.

The channel was launched in 2001 as SexTV: The Channel under the ownership of CHUM Limited named after the program of the same name aired on Citytv. The channel was acquired in 2006 when Bell Globemedia acquired the assets of CHUM which was completed in 2007 while the Citytv stations were sold to Rogers Media. Corus acquired the channel in 2010 and relaunched the channel as W Movies (a spin-off of W Network), which focuses on female-centric movies before rebranding to its current name on December 12, 2016.

History

As SexTV: The Channel
In June 2001, CHUM Limited received approval by the Canadian Radio-television and Telecommunications Commission (CRTC) to launch a national Category 2 specialty channel known as Relationship Television, a channel described as being "devoted exclusively to programming related to love, romance, marriage, relationship-themed game shows, sexuality and gender issues, family planning, relationship breakdown and magazine style programming featuring romantic vacation resorts."

The channel was launched three months later on September 7, 2001 as SexTV: The Channel, a channel modeled after and its name derived from SexTV, a now-former program on Citytv (which was a CHUM-owned property at the time). SexTV aired programming on sex and human sexuality, including issues on love, dating, romance and related subjects.

In July 2006, Bell Globemedia (later CTVglobemedia) announced that it would purchase CHUM for an estimated CAD$1.7 billion. Due to CTV planning to retain the Citytv network, SexTV: The Channel was among the channels along with A-Channel, Access, CKX-TV Brandon and CLT to be sold to Rogers Communications on April 9, 2007, awaiting the final approval. The sale was approved by the CRTC on June 8, 2007, on the condition that CTV must divest the Citytv stations, effectively cancelling the sale of SexTV: The Channel to Rogers and the transaction was completed on June 22, 2007 while the Citytv stations were sold to Rogers later that year.

As W Movies

On July 14, 2009, CTVglobemedia announced that it would sell Sex TV, along with Drive-In Classics (then Sundance Channel, now defunct), to Corus Entertainment for a combined CAD$40 million. In late September, Corus announced that the channel would be rebranded as W Movies, a spin-off of W Network with a focus on films targeting women. The sale was approved by the CRTC on November 19, with the transaction being completed by December. The on-air relaunch as W Movies took place on March 1, 2010.

On December 2, 2011, W Movies launched a high definition feed. It is currently available through all major television providers in the country.

As Cooking Channel
On October 19, 2016, Corus announced that a Canadian version of Cooking Channel—a spin-off of its Canadian version of Food Network, would be the rebranding of W Movies on December 12, 2016. Its launch came several months after Bell Media's re-launch of Gusto, which competes directly against Food Network. Scripps Networks Interactive subsequently acquired a 19.8% interest in the channel. Some providers also had to move the channel to a different number. The HD feed was also rebranded to match, and was launched in 2017 on Shaw Direct.

Programming

The Cooking Channel airs programming identical to its U.S. counterpart such as A Cook's Tour, Ace of Cakes, Bill's Food, Bitchin' Kitchen, Caribbean Food Made Easy, Chuck's Day Off, Chinese Food Made Easy, Cupcake Wars, Drink Up, Easy Chinese San Francisco by Ching He Huang, Everyday Exotic, Everyday Italian with Giada De Laurentiis, FoodCrafters, Food Jammers, French Food at Home, Good Eats, Indian Food Made Easy, Iron Chef (original Japanese version), Iron Chef America, MasterChef Canada, Spice Goddess, Two Fat Ladies, and Tyler's Ultimate, in addition to various past programs hosted by Julia Child and Nigella Lawson. Other original programs featured include Dinner at Tiffani's hosted by Tiffani Thiessen, Man Fire Food hosted by Roger Mooking, Food: Fact or Fiction? hosted by Michael McKean, Tia Mowry at Home hosted by Tia Mowry, Cheap Eats hosted by Ali Khan, Carnival Eats hosted by Noah Cappe, Rev Run's Sunday Suppers hosted by Rev Run, Unique Eats, Unique Sweets, and Donut Showdown.

As SexTV: The Channel, the network aired programming devoted to human sexuality including issues on love, dating, romance and related subjects. Past programs on the network include Sex Wars: Gender in the Age of Representation, Beyond Carnival: Sex in Brazil, and Sexploration''.

References

External links
 

English-language television stations in Canada
Corus Entertainment networks
Digital cable television networks in Canada
Television channels and stations established in 2001
2001 establishments in Canada